Andréanne Abbondanza-Bergeron (Lives and work in Montreal, Quebec) is a Canadian contemporary artist working in installation, sculpture and photography.
www.abbondanzabergeron.com

Education 
 MFA in Sculpture, 2013-2016, Concordia University
 MA in Art Education, 2007-2010, Concordia University
 BFA in Studio Arts, 2004-2007, Concordia University
 Architectural Design, 2003-2004, Université de Montréal

Works 
Andréanne Abbondanza-Bergeron is a sculptor and installation artist.  One interest of her work is to point out the disparities between inside and outside, public and private, as they point out to various forms of built and social structures of control, manipulation or power, dictating access or rejection into a specific structure or relationship.  In her work, she wants to blend those boundaries and the potential exchange that happens in this new space.  What captures her attention is the interrelation between structure and humans in space; each one possessing its own agency while also affecting the other.  She approaches sculpture and installation, using it as an inquiry into those social and spatial relations.

Her work Suspensus was presented as part of the exhibition IGNITION 12 at the Leonard & Bina Ellen Art Gallery.

Abbondanza-Bergeron presented her MFA thesis exhibition, dis]JUNCTION  in 2016 at the Maison de la Culture Frontenac.

She is the recipient of the 2016 Yvonne L. Bombardier Graduate Scholarship in Visual Arts.

In 2018 Abbondanza-Bergeron's piece, Tipping Point, was installed in the Kitchener City Hall Rotunda as part of the Contemporary Art Forum Kitchener and Area "CAFKA.18" exhibit.

Exhibitions 
Her work has been shown in solo and group exhibition at: 
  Maison de la Culture Frontenac, Montreal
 Leonard & Bina Ellen Gallery, Montreal
 Circa Art Actuel, Montreal
 Centre d'exposition de Val-D'or, Montreal
 Centre des arts actuels Skol Montreal 
 Market Gallery, Glasgow
 Tactile Bosch Gallery, Cardiff
 Gutleut 15, Frankfurt
 The Garage, San Francisco
 Centre des arts et de la culture de Brompton, Sherbrooke
 Articule, Montreal
 Canadian Sculpture Centre, Toronto

References 

 Charron, Marie-Ève. "L'espace et son double". Le Devoir (September 24, 2016).
 Espace 108 : Re-Thinking Sculpture. Review by Claire Moeder on Chantier Libre 4. Fall 2014 
 "Trois expositions, trois univers au Centre d'exposition de Val-d'Or". L'Écho abitibien (Friday February 10, 2012) 
 Limage, Vanessa. Cultural chronicle for the Radio-Magazine aired on Tuesday January 31, 2012 on Radio-Canada. Val d'Or
 Dumoulin, Claire. "Art Souterrain" aired Tuesday February 23, 2010 on 89,3 FM CISM: La Marge! during the program Un Show de Mot'Arts
 "Behind the Object: the Role of Action in Contemporary Sculptural Practice". catalogue; Introduction by Trevor Gould, 2008

External links
Official website

Living people
Artists from Montreal
Canadian contemporary artists
21st-century Canadian photographers
21st-century Canadian sculptors
21st-century Canadian women artists
Year of birth missing (living people)